Nicole Rinehart is a Professor in Clinical Psychology , Director of the Deakin Child Study Centre (DCSC) and Director of Clinical and Community Partnerships at Deakin University.  She established the Deakin Child Study Centre in 2013 to create a new platform in the community for researchers and industry to come together and make a real difference in the lives of children who face developmental challenges. She is located in Victoria, Australia.

Early life and education
Nicole Rinehart completed her Masters in Clinical Psychology at Deakin University in 1996 and her PhD in experimental Neuropsychology at Monash University in 2000. Her PhD focused on neurobehavioral and neurophysiological examination of motor function in autism and Asperger's disorder. The aim of her research was to provide neurobehavioural and neurophysiological measures to quantify and qualify motor disturbance in these disorder groups.

Career
Nicole Rinehart is a Professor of Clinical psychology at Deakin University. She is an Honorary Research Fellow, at the Murdoch Children's Research Institute, and an Adjunct Professor of Clinical Psychology at Monash University. Professor Rinehart has published extensively in the areas of autism, Asperger's disorder and Attention Deficit Hyperactivity Disorder (ADHD). Professor Rinehart has a broad profile of engagement with the community, including consultation at the Melbourne Children's Clinic, and regular engagement with schools in the community. She currently serves on the Board of Directors at Autism Victoria (AMAZE).  She has contributed to the NHMRC Clinical Practice Statement for ADHD and the revision of the Australian Therapeutic Guidelines for Developmental Disabilities.

Professor Rinehart has been at the forefront of international efforts to identify clinical indices of neuromotor dysfunction in children with Autism, Asperger's disorder, and ADHD, leading as Principal or Co-Chief-Investigator on multiple University, National Health and Medical Research Council (NHMRC) and Australian Research Council (ARC) funded grants.  She has published a series of world-first studies in establishing developmental profiles and needs of children with disability, and has translated this work into clinical practice via the many teaching and clinical training seminars she has engaged in over the last decade, which have educated the next generation of teachers, psychologists, paediatricians, OT, physiotherapists, and psychiatrists on disability and mechanisms for inclusion.

Nicole has recently established a National partnership with the Australian Football League (AFL) to conduct the 'biggest game changer for children with disability' in Australia in sports to date: the establishment of the allplay.org.au web-site. This partnership is funded through Moose Toys and the National Disability Insurance Agency. Together with her team, Nicole will make a contribution to the AFL Disability Action plan to ensure that all children with disability are 'playing on an even ground'.

Professor Rinehart also leads the NHMRC-funded Sleeping Sound with Autism research study in collaboration with the Murdoch Children's Research Institute, which aims to evaluate the effectiveness of a brief behavioural sleep intervention program previously demonstrated to be effective in treating sleep problems in children across a range of abilities.

Awards and honors

Elaine Dignan award, Australian Psychological Society

Monash University Teaching Awards

Award for Outstanding Contribution to Research, Monash University

Rising Star Award, College of Clinical Psychologists

The Queens Trust for Young Australian Awards

References

Sources
 AllPlay – Making the world fit for all kids
 Walking the Talk
 Sleep on agenda at autism conference
 Sleep disturbance in autism spectrum disorders: Recent advances in research  and practice | APS

External links

 Five myths about autism
 One in Five Risk of Sibling Autism
 Telling the Difference Between Autism and Aspergers

Australian women neuroscientists
Australian neuroscientists
Australian Women of Neuroscience 2014
Living people
Year of birth missing (living people)